The Jenin Governorate is one of 16 Governorates of Palestine. It covers the northern extremity of the West Bank, including the area around the city of Jenin.

During the first six months of the First Intifada the Israeli army shot dead 59 people in Jenin Governorate.

According to the Palestinian Central Bureau of Statistics 2017 Census, the governorate had a population of 314,866. This is an increase from the reported population of 256,619 in the 2007 Census living in 47,437 households. 100,701 inhabitants (or 39%) were under the age of 63 (or 31%) were registered refugees. According to the Palestinian Central Bureau of Statistics 1997 Census, the Governorate had a population of 195,074.

It is the only governorate in the West Bank where the majority of control of land is under the Palestinian National Authority. Four Israeli settlements were evacuated as a part of Israel's unilateral disengagement plan in 2005.

Localities

Cities
 Jenin (includes Jenin camp) 
 Qabatiya

Municipalities
 Ajjah
 Arrabah
 Burqin
 Dahiyat Sabah al-Khei
 Deir Abu Da'if
 Jaba
 Kafr Dan
 Kafr Rai
 Meithalun
 Silat al-Harithiya
 Silat ad-Dhahr
 Ya'bad
 al-Yamun
 Zababdeh

Village councils
The following is a list of Palestinian localities in the Jenin Governorate with populations of more than 1,000.

 'Anin
 Anzah
 Araqah
 Arranah
 al-Attara
 Barta'a ash-Sharqiyah
 Beit Qad
 Bir al-Basha
 Deir Ghazaleh
 Fahma
 Fandaqumiya
 Faqqua
 Jalamah
 Jalbun
 Jalqamus 
Judeida
 Kufeirit

 Mirka
 Misilyah
 al-Mughayyir
 Nazlet Zeid
 Rummanah
 Sanur
 ash-Shuhada
 Sir
 at-Tayba
 Ti'inik
 Tura al-Gharbiya
 Umm ar-Rihan
 Umm at-Tut
 Zububa
Ya'bad

See also
 Governorates of Palestine

Sources

External links
 Administrative divisions in the Palestinian Territories

 
Governorates of the Palestinian National Authority in the West Bank